Moerarchis hypomacra is a species of moth of the family Tineidae. It is found in Australia (including Queensland).

Adults have white forewings with thin brown stripes. The hindwings are plain pale brown.

References

Moths described in 1923
Myrmecozelinae
Moths of Australia